25 Stanton Road is a historic house located in Brookline, Massachusetts, and is a well-preserved local example of Italianate design.

Description and history 
The -story wood-frame house was built c. 1849–1855, probably by Samuel Crafts, who also built a number of other Italianate houses nearby. The L-shaped building has deep eaves with paired brackets, and a distinctive three-part window on the second floor below one of the gables. A heavily bracketed porch in the crook of the L shelters the front entry.

The house was listed on the National Register of Historic Places on October 17, 1985.

See also
House at 5 Lincoln Road, another Crafts house
House at 44 Stanton Road, another Italianate house
National Register of Historic Places listings in Brookline, Massachusetts

References

Houses in Brookline, Massachusetts
Italianate architecture in Massachusetts
National Register of Historic Places in Brookline, Massachusetts
Houses on the National Register of Historic Places in Norfolk County, Massachusetts